Sergei Iosifovich Trishatny ( — after April 21, 1920) was an elder brother of Alexander Trishatny, with whom he worked in the supreme bodies of the Union of the Russian People (URP), a loyalist right-wing nationalist party, the most important among Black-Hundredist monarchist and antisemitic political organizations in the Russian Empire of 1905–1917. In 1905–1908 he was a secretary of the URP. In January 1920, he was detained and in April 1920, he escaped from a detention camp. After that, all traces of him were lost.

Biography 

Graduated the law faculty of the Petersburg University. Biographers point at his contacts with Pyotr Rachkovsky — the famous chief of Okhrana, the secret service of the Russian Empire, an antisemite by devotion. In November 1902 Rachkovsky returned from Paris (supposedly bringing the notoriously known "Protocols of the Elders of Zion" with himself) to Petersburg.

When the Russian revolution of 1905 began, Sergei Trishatny was a barrister. In October 1905 together with his younger brother, Alexander Trishatny took part in the organization of the Union of the Russian People (URP) under the leadership of Alexander Dubrovin. When on  the founding of the Union of the Russian People was formally announced, Sergei Trishatny was appointed a Secretary, while his brother Alexander Trishatny became the deputy chairman of the Main Board of this union, headed by Dr. Dubrovin.

Sergei Trishatny is named as the organizer of terroristic combat squads which shot and murdered political opponents of URP, from deputies of Duma to the left-wing functionaries. In 1907–1908 following growing internal conflicts and power struggle in the URP Trishatny withdrew from his active participation in the Union. From 1908 he worked as legal adviser to the Central Post Office in St. Petersburg.

After the October revolution of 1917, Trishatny did not emigrate and went to work for the Soviets. In December 1918 he got a job as an auditor of the Food committee of Nikolaevskaya railway. A year after, on December 20, 1919 he was detained by the Cheka of Petrograd which was investigating the URP case at that time, as once a member of this union. In 3 weeks, on January 12, 1920 the investigator found no corpus delicti in Trishatny's testimony and released him from detention.

Five days later, on January 17, 1920 the Cheka of Petrograd decided to detain Trishatny "as an ex-member of the URP" upon lifting of martial law in the city. Trishatny worked a camp in Petrograd until April 1, 1920, when he escaped. On April 21, 1920, the Cheka officially put Trishatny on its wanted list. His ultimate fate is unknown.

See also
 Alexander Dubrovin
 Alexander Trishatny
 Black Hundreds
 List of people who disappeared 
 Union of the Russian People

Sources

References

1865 births
1920s missing person cases
Anti-Masonry
Antisemitism in the Russian Empire
Enforced disappearances in the Soviet Union
Members of the Union of the Russian People
Missing person cases in Russia
Politicians from Saint Petersburg
People from Sankt-Peterburgsky Uyezd
Russian anti-communists
Year of death unknown